Ash Priors is a village and parish in Somerset, England, situated  north west of Taunton in the Somerset West and Taunton district.  The village has a population of 155.

History

The parish of Ash Priors was part of the Hundred of Kilmersdon.

The current house known as The Priory was probably built in the 17th century. It was owned by the Priory in Taunton before the Reformation, hence the name of the village.

Governance

The Parish meeting of all residents has responsibility for local issues, including setting an annual precept (local rate) to cover the council's operating costs and producing annual accounts for public scrutiny. The parish council evaluates local planning applications and works with the local police, district council officers, and neighbourhood watch groups on matters of crime, security, and traffic. The parish council's role also includes initiating projects for the maintenance and repair of parish facilities, as well as consulting with the district council on the maintenance, repair, and improvement of highways, drainage, footpaths, public transport, and street cleaning. Conservation matters (including trees and listed buildings) and environmental issues are also the responsibility of the council.

The village falls within the non-metropolitan district of Somerset West and Taunton, which was established on 1 April 2019. It was previously in the district of Taunton Deane, which was formed on 1 April 1974 under the Local Government Act 1972, and part of Taunton Rural District before that. The district council is responsible for local planning and building control, local roads, council housing, environmental health, markets and fairs, refuse collection and recycling, cemeteries and crematoria, leisure services, parks, and tourism.
The Village is preserved by planning regulations as an "area of restraint", meaning that no major redevelopment should take place in Ash Priors itself.

Somerset County Council is responsible for running the largest and most expensive local services such as education, social services, libraries, main roads, public transport, policing and fire services, trading standards, waste disposal and strategic planning.

It is also part of the Taunton Deane county constituency represented in the House of Commons of the Parliament of the United Kingdom. It elects one Member of Parliament (MP) by the first past the post system of election. It was part of the South West England constituency of the European Parliament prior to Britain leaving the European Union in January 2020, which elected seven MEPs using the d'Hondt method of party-list proportional representation.

Geography

Ash Priors Common, south of the village is a  local nature reserve of unimproved neutral grassland, semi-natural deciduous woodland, wet heath, scrub, carr, stream, ponds and hedgerows. The plants to be found at the site include early marsh-orchid and twayblade orchid while the animals include the Eurasian harvest mouse, viviparous lizard and tree pipit. It was the first and is the largest local nature reserve run by Taunton Deane Council.

Religious sites

The Church of the Holy Trinity was built in the 15th century. It is a Grade II* listed building.

Notable residents

Science fiction writer Arthur C. Clarke was once resident at Ballifants Farm, on the outskirts of the village.

References

External links

 

Villages in Taunton Deane
Civil parishes in Somerset